Gerhard Prohaska (born 25 March 1958) is an Austrian breaststroke swimmer. He competed in two events at the 1984 Summer Olympics.

References

External links
 

1958 births
Living people
Austrian male breaststroke swimmers
Olympic swimmers of Austria
Swimmers at the 1984 Summer Olympics
Place of birth missing (living people)
20th-century Austrian people